Marioara Trifan (born 8 March 1950) is an internationally performing American pianist and conductor.

Career
Trifan was born in Los Angeles and grew up in New Jersey. She studied at the Curtis Institute of Music, Philadelphia, and at the Juilliard School, New York, where she received Bachelor's and Master's degrees. She won prizes at several international piano competitions, such as Ferruccio Busoni International Piano Competition (1971), Premio Jaén (1973), Paloma O'Shea Santander International Piano Competition (1975), Concorso Internazionale Dino Ciani in Milan (1975), Sydney International Piano Competition (1977) and Clara Haskil International Piano Competition (1981).

She made her conducting debut in 1985 at the National Theatre Mannheim and has since extensively conducted operas, symphonies, and ballet, in Germany and the United States. Trifan was First Kapellmeister at Theater Koblenz from 1994 to 1998. Since then, she is professor and Musical Director at the Opera School of the Hochschule für Musik und Theater München in Munich and gives frequent master classes in Europe and America.

References

1950 births
Living people
Musicians from Los Angeles
Curtis Institute of Music alumni
Juilliard School alumni
Prize-winners of the Paloma O'Shea International Piano Competition
American classical pianists
American women classical pianists
Women conductors (music)
Academic staff of the University of Music and Performing Arts Munich
20th-century American pianists
20th-century American women pianists
Classical musicians from California
20th-century American conductors (music)
21st-century American conductors (music)
21st-century classical pianists
21st-century American women pianists
21st-century American pianists
American women academics